Glanamman railway station served the village of Glanamman, Carmarthenshire, Wales, from 1851 to 1958 on the Llanelly Railway.

History 
The station was opened as Cross Keys in May 1851 by the Llanelly Railway and Dock Company. It was situated on Station Road. In 1910, the stationmaster was David T Williams and by 1923 the stationmaster was Benjamin Thomas. The station closed to passengers on 18 August 1958 but it remained open for goods traffic until 30 January 1965.

References 

Disused railway stations in Carmarthenshire
Railway stations in Great Britain opened in 1851
Railway stations in Great Britain closed in 1958
1851 establishments in Wales
1958 disestablishments in Wales